Tsvetochny (masculine), Tsvetochnaya (feminine), or Tsvetochnoye (neuter) may refer to:
Tsvetochny, Republic of Adygea, a settlement in the Republic of Adygea, Russia
Tsvetochny, Kursk Oblast, a settlement in Kursk Oblast, Russia
Tsvetochnoye, a settlement in Omsk Oblast, Russia